Never Mind the Molluscs is a compilation EP released in 1993 on Sub Pop Records. Released as part of the Halifax Pop Explosion movement of the early 1990s, the EP featured four songs by emerging alternative rock bands from Halifax, Nova Scotia and Moncton, New Brunswick. Two of the featured bands, Jale and Eric's Trip, were signed directly to Sub Pop, while Sloan were signed to Geffen Records; the fourth band, Idée du Nord, were the only contributors to the compilation who never became widely known outside of the Maritime scene.

Eric's Trip contributed a medley of two separate songs, "Blue Sky for Julie/Smother", to the album. Sloan later covered "Smother" for the Geffen Records compilation album DGC Rarities Volume 1; their version recombined "Smother" into a medley with a different Eric's Trip song, "Stove" from the album Love Tara.

Track listing
 Sloan, "Pillow Fight"
 Jale, "Lung"
 Eric's Trip, "Blue Sky for Julie/Smother"
 Idée du Nord, "Iodine Eyes"

References

1993 EPs
Compilation albums by Canadian artists
1993 compilation albums
Regional music compilation albums
Sub Pop compilation albums
Alternative rock compilation albums
Indie rock compilation albums
Sub Pop EPs
Alternative rock EPs
Indie rock EPs